Southern Namoneas High School (SNHS) is a secondary school in Fefen Island, Chuuk State, Federated States of Micronesia. It is a part of the Chuuk State Department of Education.

Construction began by 1970. The fiscal year 1972 program related to the Trust Territory of the Pacific Islands funded the construction of a shop building and four classrooms, with a total of $82,200 spent.

See also
 Education in the Federated States of Micronesia

References

Chuuk State
High schools in the Federated States of Micronesia